Liffey Wanderers F.C. is an Irish association football club based in Ringsend, Dublin. Their senior team play in the Leinster Senior League Senior Division. They also regularly compete in the FAI Cup, the FAI Intermediate Cup, the FAI Junior Cup and the Leinster Senior Cup.

History

Foundation and early history
One of Ireland's oldest football clubs, Liffey Wanderers were formed in 1885 on Pearse Street (then called Great Brunswick Street). Founding members were dockworkers from Dublin Port. Writers Aileen O'Carroll and Don Bennett have described the club as being at the 'centre of the athletic tradition of the docklands' in its early years. The club was favoured by dockworkers from South Dublin leading to its clubhouse being attacked by gangs and rival fans from North Dublin. Officials and club members had frequently to carry their own goal-posts to the 'away' venues, as well as sometimes having to fight off attempts by rival club supporters to make off with them. Stewarding at football games in nineteenth-century Dublin was very often carried out by jarvies, fifty or sixty 'hard' men, who kept over-enthusiastic supporters clear of the touch-lines by means of horsewhips.

"Golden Era"
Playing in the regional Leinster Senior League, then a de facto second-tier of football in Ireland, the early years of the twentieth century would see success for the Liffey's. The club claimed the Junior Combination Cup in the 1904–05 season, and won the Empire Cup (an All-Ireland Junior Cup) three times in-a-row between 1904 and 1906. Liffey's were allowed to keep the trophy to commemorate the achievement, and today it sits in FAI headquarters on permanent display. A member of the Cup winning side in those years was future Ireland international and Barcelona manager Patrick O'Connell, then just a teenager.

Decline
The club remained a junior club in the Leinster Senior League and never stepped up to senior-level in the Irish League. The effects of World War I, the Irish War of Independence and the Irish Civil War between 1914 and 1923 were heavily felt by clubs like Liffey's as they lost many men to enlistment, recruitment and fatalities, and so the club went into hibernation. Following the partition of Ireland, Liffey's were re-established in 1924. They kept their junior status and did not join the newly established League of Ireland in 1921. Liffey's were immortalised in 1922 when Irish author James Joyce mentioned the club in his epic novel Ulysses.

Roughly around 1940, the club went dormant for a second time, only to be re-established in 1945 by former players and other aficionados of waterfront football.

Later developments
In 2010, Wanderers went out of existence for a third time. They were reformed in 2013 and entered the Leinster Senior League's sixth tier. On 17 May 2015, Wanderers lifted their first FAI Junior Cup, beating Sheriff YC 2–1 in extra-time at the Aviva Stadium. In what was their first ever appearance in the Cup's final stage, Lee O'Connor and Stephen O'Callaghan both scored to bring the trophy Wanderers' way. Two years later, on 13 May 2017, Wanderers claimed the FAI Intermediate Cup in what was, again, their debut appearance in a cup final. They won after beating Cork side Cobh Wanderers at the Aviva Stadium 5–4 in a penalty shootout after the score was tied at 2–2 at the end of extra-time. Goals from Clayton Maher and Aidan Roche and five out of six penalties scored in the shoot-out ensured the cup went to Dublin.

In May 2018, the club beat Dublin Bus to cap off a fifth straight promotion since their re-emergence in 2013, thus enabling them to play in the Leinster Senior League's Sunday Senior Division. The club announced on the same day that their original, historic club-house in City Quay would be returning to the club after many years.

Notable former players

Ireland internationals
Two Liffey Wanderers F.C. players represented Ireland at full international level.

  Patrick O'Connell
  Peter Warren

Honours
Junior Combination Cup
Winners: 1904–05: 1
Empire Cup
Winners: 1904, 1905, 1906: 3
FAI Intermediate Cup
Winners: 2016–17: 1 
FAI Junior Cup
Winners: 2014–15: 1

References

Ringsend
Leinster Senior League (association football) clubs
Association football clubs in Dublin (city)
1885 establishments in Ireland
Association football clubs established in 1885
Former Athletic Union League (Dublin) clubs
Ulysses (novel)